This is a list of lists of child actors.

Former child actors
 List of American former child actors
 List of British former child actors
 List of Filipino former child actors

Current child actors
 List of American current child actors
 List of British current child actors
 List of Filipino current child actors

Combined lists
List of Australian child actors
List of Canadian child actors
List of Chinese child actors
List of Dutch child actors
List of French child actors
List of German child actors
List of Indian child actors
List of Irish child actors
List of Italian child actors
List of Japanese child actors
List of New Zealand child actors
List of Spanish child actors
List of Swedish child actors

Actors
Lists of actors